The Richard Harris Award for Outstanding Contribution by an Actor is a British Independent Film Award that is given to the actor or actress whom the academy feels has contributed highly to British films throughout their career. The award was introduced at the 2003 ceremony.

Winners
 2003: John Hurt
 2004: Bob Hoskins
 2005: Tilda Swinton
 2006: Jim Broadbent
 2007: Ray Winstone
 2008: David Thewlis
 2009: Daniel Day-Lewis
 2010: Helena Bonham Carter
 2011: Ralph Fiennes
 2012: Michael Gambon
 2013: Julie Walters
 2014: Emma Thompson
 2015: Chiwetel Ejiofor
 2016: Alison Steadman
 2017: Vanessa Redgrave
 2018: Judi Dench
 2019: Kristin Scott Thomas
 2020: Glenda Jackson
 2021: Riz Ahmed
 2022: Samantha Morton

British film awards
British Independent Film Awards
Awards established in 2003